Indicaxanthin is a type of betaxanthin, a plant pigment present in beets, in Mirabilis jalapa flowers, in cacti such as prickly pears (Opuntia sp.) or the red dragonfruit (Hylocereus costaricensis). It is a powerful antioxidant.

Medical uses 
It has been shown in a spectrophotometric study for patients with thalassemia, that indicaxanthin can reduce perferryl-Hb generated in solution from met-Hb and hydrogen peroxide, more effectively than either trolox (a vitamin E derivative) or vitamin C, possibly interfering with perferryl-Hb, a reactive intermediate in the hydroperoxide-dependent Hb degradation.

Indicaxanthin in antioxidant studies was more effective than Trolox at scavenging the ABTS cation radical.

See also
 Vulgaxanthin

References

Food antioxidants
Betalains
Pyrrolidines
Tetrahydropyridines
Dicarboxylic acids